El Zapotal is a Totonac archaeological site located in the Ignacio de la Llave Municipality in Veracruz, Mexico. It contains the ruins of a Totonac city that flourished from 600 to 900 CE, during what archaeologists call the Classical Period.

Discovery 
The site of El Zapotal was discovered in 1971 when several human burials with offerings of clay sculptures were found. The sculptures included a group of women with naked torsos, identified as representations of Cihuatéotl, the lady of the land; these representations are now exhibited in the Museo de Antropología de Xalapa.

Site 
El Zapotal is a significant Totonac site whose apogee seems to have occurred at the end of the Late Classical Period and the beginning of the Early Postclassical period. Although it contains many buildings, only a few have been explored.

Mictlantecuhtli shrine 
One notable sculpture, made from painted, unbaked clay, is an image of Mictlantecuhtli, the Death God, represented as an emaciated person. The sculpture sits on an elaborate throne, and the backrest is integrated into the huge headdress worn by the deity, with human skulls in profile and the heads of fantastic lizards and jaguars. The body of the statuette is emaciated, with some joints, bones, ribs, and the skull exposed. In addition, its tongue hangs out as a symbol of the dark underworld.

The sculpture is located on the side of a shrine. The side walls of the shrine were decorated with scenes of priests in procession on a red background. Excavations at the shrine found many offerings of clay figures, as well as remains of nearly a hundred individuals, indicating elaborate funerary rituals. The offerings cover several stratigraphic layers.

Because of its fragility, the sculpture was kept on site, and a museum was founded there.

See also 
Other archaeological sites in Veracruz:
 El Tajín (300–1200)
 Papantla (900–1519)
 Cempoala (900–1519)
 Cuyuxquihui
 Castillo de Teayo
 El Cuajilote
 El Manatí

References 

Mesoamerican sites
Archaeological sites in Mexico
Archaeological sites in Veracruz
Totonac sites